Simon Yacoub (born June 9, 1989, in Leipzig, Germany) is a Palestinian judoka. He competed at the 2016 Summer Olympics in the men's 60 kg event, in which he was eliminated in the first round by Walide Khyar.

References

External links 
 

1989 births
Living people
Palestinian male judoka
Olympic judoka of Palestine
Judoka at the 2016 Summer Olympics